Sillerboån is stream in Ljusdal Municipality, Hälsingland, Gävleborgs län, Sweden that is about 80 kilometers long.

Ljusdal Municipality
Rivers of Gävleborg County